Deniss Kozlovs (born 28 November 1983) is a Latvian judoka.

Achievements

References

External links
 

1983 births
Living people
Latvian male judoka